Friederike "Fritzi" Burger (6 June 1910 – 16 February 1999) was an Austrian figure skater. She was a two-time Olympic silver medalist (1928, 1932), a four-time World medalist (silver in 1929 and 1932, bronze in 1928 and 1931), the 1930 European champion, and a four-time Austrian national champion (1928–1931).

Life and career 
Burger was born on 6 June 1910 in Vienna. Her family was Jewish.

She won the first-ever contested European Championships, held in 1930. Sonja Henie, who held a monopoly in women's figure skating at the time, was not present at this championship and Burger never defeated her in competition.  She placed second behind Henie at the 1928 and 1932 Winter Olympics, and in the 1929 and 1932 World Championships.

After the 1932 Olympics, Burger ended her skating career and went to London, where in 1935 she married Shinkichi Nishikawa, a grandson of the Japanese pearl tycoon Kōkichi Mikimoto. She returned with her husband to Vienna, where she gave birth to her son in the summer of 1937, just before the Anschluss (annexation of Austria by Nazi Germany).She, her husband and son moved to London in 1938 and a few years later moved to Tokyo, Japan where Mr. Nishikawa was from. 

In the 1990s, living in the United States, Burger was interviewed for several documentaries on the history of figure skating. She joked in a 1994 interview, "I had two husbands. [Sonja Henie] even beat me at that. She had three." She died on 16 February 1999 in Bad Gastein, Austria.

Results

See also
 List of select Jewish figure skaters

References

External links
 Picture of Fritzi Burger
 New York Times topics: In the Fading Light Of the Brilliant Henie
 Jews in sports – Burger, Fritzi
 Preface to "Searching for Fritzi"
 Reviews of "Searching for Fritzi," 1999

Book

Navigation

1910 births
1999 deaths
Figure skaters from Vienna
Austrian female single skaters
Jewish Austrian sportspeople
Olympic silver medalists for Austria
Olympic figure skaters of Austria
Figure skaters at the 1928 Winter Olympics
Figure skaters at the 1932 Winter Olympics
Olympic medalists in figure skating
World Figure Skating Championships medalists
European Figure Skating Championships medalists
Medalists at the 1928 Winter Olympics
Medalists at the 1932 Winter Olympics